Emil Muller or Emil Müller may refer to:

 Emil Müller (mathematician) (1861–1927), Austrian mathematician
 Emil Müller (German officer), an officer in the World War I Imperial German Army charged with war crimes at the Leipzig War Crimes Tribunal
 Emil Muller (athlete) (1891–1958), American discus thrower
 Emil Müller (athlete) (born 1908), Swiss long-distance runner
 Emil Müller (mycologist) (1920–2008), Swiss mycologist